The following is a list of Brown Bears men's basketball head coaches. The Bears have had 31 coaches in their 116-season history.

Brown's current head coach is Mike Martin. He was hired in May 2012 to replace Jesse Agel, who was fired after the 2011–12 season.

References

Brown

Brown Bears men's basketball coaches